The 1982–83 season is Real Madrid Club de Fútbol's 81st season in existence and the club's 52nd consecutive season in the top flight of Spanish football.

Summary
Club legend Alfredo Di Stéfano came back to the club as head coach in a high-expected movement after he was La Liga champion managing Valencia CF in 1971. Finally, after a long turmoil lasting almost a year Incumbent Luis de Carlos won the reelection as President of the club on 9 October 1982 defeating the electoral campaign of challenger Ramon Mendoza by more than 3,000 votes. Mendoza was linked by Cambio 16 magazine with Soviet Spy agency KGB, prompting to quit his position as vice-president on board of directors during Autumn.

For the third consecutive season, De Carlos reinforced the club with low-profile players such as Dutch defender John Metgod from AZ Alkmaar English striker Laurie Cunningham suffered injury issues during almost the entire campaign and was loaned out by the club to Manchester United in April.

The campaign is best remembered by the bizarre fact of five trophies closely lost, four of them in four closely contested finals (Supercopa, European Cup Winners' Cup, Copa del Rey and Copa de La Liga). Besides that, in La Liga the squad finished in 2nd place a single point behind champions basque-side Athletic Bilbao after losing 0–1 against former Di Stefano club Valencia in the ultimate match at Mestalla Stadium. Madrid were leading most of the rounds before the game and only needed a draw to clinch the title.

Squad

Transfers

Competitions

La Liga

Position by round

League table

Matches

Copa del Rey

Round of 16

Quarter-finals

Semi-finals

Final

European Cup Winners' Cup

Round of 16

Quarter-finals

Semi-finals

Final

Copa de la Liga

Quarter-finals

Semi-finals

Final

Supercopa de España

Statistics

Players statistics

References

External links
 BDFútbol

Real Madrid CF seasons
Real Madrid